Adiwiraku is a 2017 Malaysian Malay-language drama film directed by Eric Ong and Written by Jason Chong, Yentanamera and main actor, Sangeeta Krishnasamy. The film chronicles the experiences of Cheryl Ann Fermando, a rural schoolteacher. The film received Best Film Award at the 29th Malaysia Film Festival.

References

External links 
 
 
 

2017 films
Malaysian drama films
Malay-language films
2017 drama films